Bayadere may refer to:

 Bayadere is a European term for devadasi — a female dancer in India, often clothed in loose Eastern costume
Bayadere (fabric), an Indian silk fabric 
 Die Bajadere, an operetta by Emmerich Kalman
 Die Bajadere, a polka by Johann Strauss II
 La Bayadère, a ballet by  Marius Petipa to the music of Ludwig Minkus

See also
Nautch